Yrjö Henrik Kallinen (15 June 1886 - 1 January 1976) was a Finnish railwayman, cooperative movement functionary and politician, born in Oulu. He was imprisoned from 1918 to 1921 for having sided with the Reds during the Finnish Civil War. Before he was finally imprisoned, he had had four death sentences, but managed to be pardoned.

From 27 March 1946 to 29 July 1948, Kallinen served as Minister of Defence of Finland. He was a member of the Parliament of Finland from 1945 to 1948, representing the Social Democratic Party of Finland (SDP).

References
 

1886 births
1976 deaths
People from Oulu
People from Oulu Province (Grand Duchy of Finland)
Social Democratic Party of Finland politicians
Ministers of Defence of Finland
Members of the Parliament of Finland (1945–48)
People of the Finnish Civil War (Red side)
Prisoners and detainees of Finland
Cooperative theorists
Cooperative advocates